Ruba Nadda (born 6 December 1972) is a Canadian film director. She made several award-winning short films, including Lost Woman Story, Interstate Love Story, So Far Gone and Damascus Nights before writing and directing features I Always Come to You, Unsettled and Sabah. Her movie Cairo Time won the Best Canadian Feature Film award at the 2009 Toronto International Film Festival and was Best Reviewed Romance on Rotten Tomatoes for 2010. She is known for shooting feature films in very short time spans.

Early life and education
Nadda was born to a Syrian father and a Palestinian mother.

Nadda studied literature at York University in Toronto, Ontario. She went on to study Film Production at NYU's Tisch School of the Arts and completed a six-week course there.

Directing career

Nadda made her feature film debut with Sabah starring actress Arsinée Khanjian in the title role.

Her next film Cairo Time, starring Patricia Clarkson and Alexander Siddig, was released in 2009 and won Best Canadian Feature Film at the 2009 Toronto International Film Festival.

In 2012 Nadda reunited with her Cairo Time star Siddig to film Inescapable, a thriller which also featured Marisa Tomei and Joshua Jackson.

Nadda released her next film October Gale in 2014. The film, a thriller set in Georgian Bay, would reunite her with her Cairo Time star Patricia Clarkson. The film premiered at the 2014 Toronto International Film Festival.

In September 2014 Nadda announced that she would be reuniting with Patricia Clarkson on a TV series for HBO titled Elisabeth.

Personal life

In September 2014 Nadda announced that she was seven months pregnant.

Filmography

Films
1997 
 Wet Heat Drifts Through the Afternoon 
 Interstate Love Story 
 Do Nothing 
1998
 The Wind Blows Towards Me Particularly
 So Far Gone 
 Damascus Nights
1999
 Slut
 Laila
2000
 I Always Come to You
 Blue Turning Grey Over You 
 Black September
 I Would Suffer Cold Hands for You 
2001
 Unsettled
2004
 Aadan
2005
 Sabah 
2009
 Cairo Time
2012
 Inescapable
2015
 October Gale

Television
2016-2017
Killjoys
2016
 This Life
2017-2018
 NCIS: Los Angeles
2017-2019
 Frankie Drake Mysteries
2017
 Valor
2018
Hawaii Five-O
Taken
2019
Arrow
Roswell, New Mexico
The InBetween
Krypton
2020 
Lincoln Rhyme: Hunt for the Bone Collector 
2021
Murdoch Mysteries
Hudson & Rex (S3E3, Into the Wild)
2022
Queens (S1E12, Let the Past Be Past)
Riverdale
(S6E13, Chapter One Hundred and Eight: Ex-Libris)
Tom Swift (S1E8, ...And the Book of Isaac)
Big Shot (S2E4, 17 Candles)
2023
Magnum P.I
Alaska Daily (S1E8, "Tell a Reporter Not to Do Something and Suddenly It's a Party")

Awards
2009: Won Best Canadian Feature Film award at the 2009 Toronto International Film Festival for Cairo Time
2010: Best Reviewed Romance on Rotten Tomatoes for 2010 for Cairo Time

References

External links

Cairo Time website

1972 births
Canadian people of Palestinian descent
Canadian people of Syrian descent
Canadian people of Arab descent
Canadian women film directors
Film directors from Montreal
Living people
Tisch School of the Arts alumni
York University alumni